In psychology, number sense is the term used for the hypothesis that some animals, particularly humans, have a biologically determined ability that allows them to represent and manipulate large numerical quantities.  The term was popularized by Stanislas Dehaene in his 1997 book "The Number Sense".

Psychologists believe that the number sense in humans can be differentiated into the approximate number system, a system that supports the estimation of the magnitude, and the parallel individuation system, which allows the tracking of individual objects, typically for quantities below 4.

There are also some differences in how number sense is defined in math cognition. For example, Gersten and Chard say number sense "refers to a child's fluidity and flexibility with numbers, the sense of what numbers mean and an ability to perform mental mathematics and to look at the world and make comparisons."

In non-human animals, number sense is not the ability to count, but the ability to perceive changes in the number of things in a collection. All mammals, and most birds, will notice if there is a change in the number of their young nearby. Many birds can distinguish two from three.

Researchers consider number sense to be of prime importance for children in early elementary education, and the National Council of Teachers of Mathematics has made number sense a focus area of pre-K through 2nd grade mathematics education.  An active area of research is to create and test teaching strategies to develop children's number sense. Number sense also refers to the contest hosted by the University Interscholastic League.  This contest is a ten-minute test where contestants solve math problems mentally—no calculators, scratch-work, or mark-outs are allowed.

Concepts involved in number sense
The term "number sense" involves several concepts of magnitude, ranking, comparison, measurement, rounding, percents, and estimation, including:
 estimating with large numbers to provide reasonable approximations;
 judging the degree of precision appropriate to a situation;
understanding the hidden meaning of numbers through analytical and critical thinking (e.g., Freakonomics);
 rounding (understanding reasons for rounding large numbers and limitations in comparisons);
 choosing measurement units to make sense for a given situation;
 solving real-life problems involving percentages and decimal portions;
 comparing physical measurements within and between the U.S. and metric systems; and
 comparing degrees Fahrenheit and Celsius in real-life situations.
Those concepts are taught in elementary-level education.

See also

References

External links
Number Worlds - a site with number sense development materials

Cognitive science
Educational psychology